Living Shades is the second self-made EP of Austrian Melodic metalcore band Sympathy for Nothing. After winning at Austrian band contest where the band won 14.000 Euros and more prizes for 100.000 Euros, including producing a professional music video and CD the band went into Hinterhof Studios and Gosh Studios to produce Living Shades. The CD consists out ouf 4 tracks, a music video and an online mediabook.

Cover design and booklet 
The freehand-drawings are from singer Richard J. Thallinger, the band logo from drummer Martin Wagner and layout designs are from keyboarder Klaus Schobesberger.

Track listing 
 Little Something
 Roads to Rome
 Remedy the Mess
 D.F.M.H. (Don't Fuck My Heart)
 Music video Roads to Rome
 Online media book

Lyrics 
The songs handle topics such as love, politics, war, social problems and personal experiences from the band members.

Success 
The music video of Roads to Rome reached fifth place at MyVideo Music star and won the MTV Rookie Award in March 2009. Many famous online magazines such as Powermetal and Vampster gave the EP positive reviews.

External links
 Official Roads to Rome Video at YouTube
 Critic at powermetal.de
 Critic at metal.de
 Critic at metal-inside.de
 Critic at vampster

Sympathy for Nothing albums
2009 EPs